Ashtead Cricket Club is a cricket club that plays in the Surrey Championship Premier League. The club was formed in 1887 and play their home games at Woodfield Lane, Ashtead. The club has a second ground for junior matches and training, on the former playing fields of Parsons Mead School. The club's 3rd and 4th XIs play their home games at Box Hill School.

In 2014 the club finished runners-up in the ECB National Club Twenty20, losing to winners Chester Boughton Hall at Wantage Road, Northampton.

Honours

First XI honours
 Surrey Championship 
 Club T20
 Champions – 2014
 Division 1
 Champions – 2015
 Division 2
 Champions – 2005, 2014
 Division 3
 Champions – 2001
ECB National Club Twenty20
 Runners up – 2014

Second XI honours
Surrey Championship 
 Division 1
 Champions – 2010, 2012
 Division 2
 Champions – 2009
 Division 3
 Champions – 2008
 Division 4
 Champions – 2007

Third XI honours
Surrey Championship 
Division 1
Champions – 2015

Fourth XI honours
Surrey Championship 
 West Division
Champions – 2008
 East Division
 Champions – 2015

Notable players 
The cricketers listed below have played in First-Class or List A cricket teams.

 Aamer Nazir
 Andrew Ellis
 Neil Farnsworth
 Ben Jeffery
 Ben Sidwell
 Carl Anderson
Damian Shirazi
 Danny Miller
 Dave Burton
 David White
 Dominic Sibley
 Gary Martin
 Gary Wilson
 Harri Aravinthan
 James Cameron
 John Vaughan-Davies
 Jono Sole
 Mahesh Rawat
 Matthew Friedlander
Sean Hunt
 Seb Stewart
 Paul Harrison
 Paul Taylor
 Tom Williams
 Will Pereira
 Zac Elkin

References 

Cricket clubs established in 1887